The Naval Annual was a periodical that provided considerable text and graphic information (largely concerning the British Royal Navy) which had previously been obtainable only by consulting a wide range of often foreign language publications. During its life it underwent a number of title changes.   

The Annual was started by Thomas Brassey, 1st Earl Brassey, in 1886. Though often compared with Jane's Fighting Ships, the two British annuals were, in fact quite different. The Brassey series began a dozen years earlier, and its special strength was the dozen or more detailed articles on naval (plus, from 1920 through 1935, merchant marine) matters, authored by experts. They covered British and other nations' naval developments ranging from the latest ships to overall policy.    

The first five or six Brassey volumes used a second printing colour (a light blue green) to highlight armored portions of naval vessels' hulls. Through 1949, the series was also known for its extensive tabular presentations of individual ship details. But unlike Jane's, the Brassey series was not designed for use in identifying ships at sea. Starting with the 1950 volume, content broadened to cover air force and army topics in addition to naval material, with a continued emphasis on British forces. Long runs of the Brassey volumes are relatively uncommon in American libraries.

Editors of Brassey's Annuals 1886–1992

Naval Annual

1886–1890 Lord Brassey
1891–1899 T. A. Brassey
1900–1901 John Leyland
1902–1905 T. A. Brassey
1906 John Leyland and T. A. Brassey
1907–1913 T. A. Brassey (Viscount Hythe from 1911)
1914 Viscount Hythe and J. Leyland (The  title became Brassey's Naval Annual.)
1915–1916 John Leyland (These two volumes excluded many details of Royal Navy vessels so as not to aid the enemy.)
1917–1918 Not published
1919 2nd Earl Brassey and J. Leyland

Naval and Shipping Annual
(For this 15-year period, the Annual covered naval and merchant shipping, plus occasional articles on maritime aviation.)
 
1920–1928 Sir Alexander Richardson and Archibald Hurd
1929 C. N. Robinson
1930–1935 C. N. Robinson and H. M. Ross

Brassey's Naval Annual

1936 C. N. Robinson
1937–1949 H. G. Thursfield (The 1948 volume differed from all before and after—it was devoted to printing Hitler's naval conference proceedings.)

Brassey's Annual – The Armed Forces Yearbook

1950–1963 H. G. Thursfield
1964–1973 J. L. Moulton

Royal United Services Institute and Brassey's Defence Yearbook

1974–1975 editorial board: S. W. B. Menaul, R. G. S. Bidwell, R. H. F. Cox
1976 editorial board: S. W. B. Menaul, A. E. Younger, R. H. F. Cox
1977–1979 editorial board: A. E. Younger, E. F. Gueritz, R. H. F. Cox
1980–1982 editorial board: E. F. Gueritz, Henry Stanhope, Jennifer Shaw
1983–1984 editorial board: Group Captain David Bolton RAF (rtd), Henry Stanhope, Jennifer Shaw
1985 editorial board: Group Captain David Bolton RAF (rtd), Henry Stanhope, Jennifer Shaw, Maj-Gen (rtd) A. J. Trythall.  Editor: B. H. Reid
1986–88 ???
1989 editorial board: Group Captain David Bolton RAF (rtd), Group Captain G. Gilbert AFC RAF (rtd), Henry Stanhope, Jennifer Shaw, Maj-Gen (rtd) A. J. Trythall, Jonathan Eyal
1990 editorial board: Group Captain David Bolton RAF (rtd), Helen MacDonald, Henry Stanhope, Jennifer Shaw, Maj-Gen (rtd) A.J. Trythall, Jonathan Eyal
1991 editorial board: Group Captain David Bolton RAF (rtd), Henry Stanhope, Jennifer Shaw, Maj-Gen (rtd) A. J. Trythall, Jonathan Eyal
1992 editorial board: Group Captain David Bolton RAF (rtd), Jennifer Shaw, Maj-Gen (rtd) A. J. Trythall, Jonathan Eyal

See also
 Brassey's Publishers Ltd : publisher associated with the annual
 Jane's Fighting Ships (originally Jane's All the World's Fighting Ships) : competing publication
 Combat Fleets of the World : competing publication

Footnotes

References
 Brassey, Thomas (ed.), The Naval Annual, Portsmouth: Griffin & Co., 1886.
 Brooks, Richard. Fred T. Jane: An Eccentric Visionary, Coulsdon, Surrey: Jane's Information Systems, 1997.
 Ranft, Bryan (ed.), Ironclad to Trident,  100 Years of Defence Commentary, BRASSEYS's 1886–1986, Brassey's Defence Publishing (part of the Pergamon Group), 1986.  .
 Royal United Services Institute and Brassey's Defence Yearbook, 1989.  .
 Royal United Services Institute and Brassey's Defence Yearbook, 1990.  .
 Royal United Services Institute and Brassey's Defence Yearbook, 1991.  .
 Royal United Services Institute and Brassey's Defence Yearbook, 1992.  .

External links 

Books of naval history
Publications established in 1886
1886 establishments in the United Kingdom